The 1900 Auburn Tigers football team represented Auburn University in the 1900 Southern Intercollegiate Athletic Association football season. It was the Tigers' 9th overall season and they competed as a member of the Southern Intercollegiate Athletic Association (SIAA). The team was led by head coach Walter H. Watkins, in his first year, and finished with a record of four wins and zero losses (4–0 overall, 4–0 in the SIAA).

Schedule

Season summary

Nashville
Auburn opened the season against the University of Nashville, On a wet and heavy field, Auburn won 28–0.

Tennessee
Auburn beat the Tennessee Volunteers  23–0 .

Alabama
Auburn easily defeated the Alabama team 53–5. Auburn's Yarborough scored 3 touchdowns, once on a run of 75 yards. Noll scored twice, once on a run of 55 yards.

Georgia
To close the season, Auburn defeated rival Georgia 44–0.

References

Auburn
Auburn Tigers football seasons
College football undefeated seasons
Auburn Tigers football